Boban Petrović (19 July 1957 – 27 September 2021), was a Serbian professional basketball player.

Playing career 
A forward, Petrović played 18 seasons in Yugoslavia, France, Spain, and Belgium from 1979 to 1996. He played for Partizan between 1979 and 1985, scoring 3,618 points in 273 games which ranks him the 10th all-time scoring leader in the club's history. Also, he won two FIBA Korać Cups, two Yugoslav League titles, and a Yugoslav Cup with Partizan. Following his departure from Partizan, he played also for Reims Champagne, Olimpija, Napredak Kruševac, and Hasselt BT. He retired as a player with Hasselt BT after the end of the 1993–94 season.

National team career 
Petrović was a member of the Yugoslavia national team, alongside Krešimir Ćosić, Dragan Kićanović, Dražen Dalipagić, and Mirza Delibašić, that won the silver medal at the EuroBasket 1981 held in Czechoslovakia. Over nine tournament games, he averaged 7.1 points per game. Also, he was a member of the Yugoslav roster that won the bronze medal at the 1982 FIBA World Championship in Colombia. Over nine tournament games, he averaged 11.6 points per game.

Personal life 
Slovenian basketball player Peter Vilfan was his best man.

After having a traffic accident in September 2021, Petrović spent the last few days of his life in a hospital in South Africa where he died on 27 September. Partizan host an event in his honour on 6 October.

Source 
 Duško Miletković "Souly" (2016), Kuliranje Bobana Petrovića (in Serbian)

References

1957 births
2021 deaths
Bàsquet Manresa players
Competitors at the 1979 Mediterranean Games
KK Napredak Kruševac players
KK Partizan players
KK Olimpija players
Medalists at the 1979 Summer Universiade
Mediterranean Games silver medalists for Yugoslavia
Mediterranean Games medalists in basketball
Power forwards (basketball)
Serbian expatriate sportspeople in South Africa
Serbian expatriate basketball people in Belgium
Serbian expatriate basketball people in France
Serbian expatriate basketball people in Slovenia
Serbian expatriate basketball people in Spain
Serbian men's basketball players
Small forwards
Sportspeople from Kruševac
Universiade silver medalists for Yugoslavia
Yugoslav men's basketball players
1982 FIBA World Championship players